The Zec Pabok is a "zone d'exploitation contrôlée" (Controlled harvesting zone) (ZEC) located in the municipality of Chandler in the Le Rocher-Percé Regional County Municipality (RCM) in administrative region Gaspésie-Îles-de-la-Madeleine, in Quebec, in Canada. The ZEC has a mixed use including salmon fishing.

Geography 

Zec Pabok is located near the banks of the Baie-des-Chaleurs and close to the Zec des Anses.

Toponymy 

The name Zec Pabok was formalized on December 12, 1997, to the Bank of place names in the Commission de toponymie du Québec (Geographical Names Board of Quebec).

See also

References

Related articles 
 Baie des Chaleurs, Gaspésie
 Gaspé, Gaspésie
 Chandler 
 Réserve écologique de la Grande-Rivière (Ecological Reserve of Grande-Rivière) 
 Zec des Anses
 Zone d'exploitation contrôlée (Controlled harvesting zone) (ZEC)

Protected areas of Gaspésie–Îles-de-la-Madeleine
Protected areas established in 1997